Myristica pubicarpa is a species of plant in the family Myristicaceae. It is a tree endemic to the Maluku Islands in Indonesia. It is an endangered species.

References

pubicarpa
Endemic flora of the Maluku Islands
Trees of the Maluku Islands
Vulnerable plants
Taxonomy articles created by Polbot